The Gyooe Line (suburb line) is a railway line in Gyeonggi-do, South Korea, that connects Neunggok Station in Goyang City (northwest of Seoul) with Uijeongbu Station in Uijeongbu, north of Seoul.

History 

Work on the line began already in October 1959.  Following the 1961 coup, the Supreme Council for National Reconstruction started South Korea's first five-year plan, which included a construction program to complete the railway network, to foster economic growth.  The  line from Neunggok on the Gyeongui Line to Uijeongbu on the Gyeongwon Line was incorporated into the program and was completed on August 20, 1963.

Operation

Currently, the line is single-track, unelectrified, sees very little use and has no scheduled passenger service.
Irregular freight train service was stopped in October 2013; Iryeong Station was downgraded to unattended station on January 24, 2014.After that,
the line became inoperational and used for model photoshooting etc. more or less legally until test run of freight trains resumed at the end of 
2015 until end of January 2016. Following to the re-railing works at the northern part of Seoul Station, a need to re-route the freight trains
through Gyooe lines occurred, and as the Yongsan Line became underground thus unusable for peacetime freight train service(incline of 34.5 permils)
and Hyochang Line was abolished, the trains have to be rerouted through the Gyooe Line and thus test operation resumed on April 20, 2016, with 
its railroad crossings operational and staffed again. Regular freight train operation resumes on May 16, 2016 .

Future
 Goyang-Si, Yangju-si, Uijeongbu hope re-opening of Gyooe Line as circular railway line of Gyeonggi Province.
 As an extension of the future Daegok–Sosa–Wonsi Line, the Gyooe Line may be upgraded to a double-track, electrified railway, and see regular passenger service integrated into the Seoul Metropolitan Subway.
 The three cities and Korail decided to repair the Gyooe line, from Daegok Station to Uijeongbu Station until 2023. The railway condition will be unelectrified Single-track railway. The repaired Korail Commuter Diesel Car will be used.

See also

 Transportation in South Korea

References

Railway lines in South Korea
Railway lines opened in 1961